FK Polet is a Serbian football club based in Nakovo, Kikinda, Serbia. The club currently competes in the PFL Zrenjanin, Serbian fifth level of football competition.

History
The club was founded in 1946 in Nakovo.

Recent results

External links
 Polet Nakovo on Srbijasport.net
 FK Polet Nakovo 

Polet Nakovo
Polet Nakovo
1946 establishments in Serbia